The Balneario da Toxa (Galician for: A Toxa Island Spa) or Grand Hotel of A Toxa is a spa-hotel located in La Toja Island, in Galicia, Spain.

It was inaugurated in 1907 and in 1945 the building was restored, with an almost complete refurbishment carried out, although various old elements subsist.

History

18th Century
In 1808, fishermen in the local ria found the warm waters of the island had healing qualities. Later, a loaded donkey with a number of ulcers and with ringworm was abandoned by its owner on the island. After a few months the owner was surprised to find the healthy animal. The donkey had wallowed in the island's mud and its wounds had disappeared. This story was told by the Countess of Pardo Bazán in 1911. This story helped make way for the creation of a Grand Hotel in A Toxa.

Former Balneario de A Toxa

In 1907 the hotel was built, based on the popular spas of the time such as the Marienbad in Germany.

Two pavilions were built, one room and the casino, connected by a gallery. The architect was Daniel Vázquez Gulias. The interior was decorated with frescoes in the halls and stairs. A Toxa, was at that time a resort for the upper class of Galicia. The hotel had several boom years, was famed across the peninsula and came to be known by the court in Madrid, at the time A Toxa was already popular as a spa.

Restoration
In 1945 there was a restoration, the towers were pulled down and an almost complete refurbishment was done. Today it is a five star hotel maintained by its director Francisco Marcos. The striking staircase and windows reminiscent of its glory days, the rooms have been restored, the building has furniture from the past, and has views of the island. The building's old columns remain, but the rest is new.

References

Buildings and structures completed in 1907
Casinos completed in 1907
Eclectic architecture
Buildings and structures completed in 1945
Spa towns in Spain
Hotels in Spain
Defunct casinos